That's My Baby! is a 1944 American film directed by William Berke and starring Richard Arlen, Ellen Drew, and Leonid Kinskey.

Plot 
Phineas Moody, the head of Moody Comics is in terrible health. His worried daughter Betty calls in two doctors who discover that Phineas hasn't laughed in decades. Betty and her future husband Tim Jones fill the Moody mansion full of a variety of vaudeville acts to make Phineas laugh again. When that fails, the pair track down Phineas's estranged wife Hettie, who Betty hasn't seen since childhood. The film concludes with the making of an animated cartoon that is shown to Phineas and Hettie.

Cast 
Richard Arlen as Tim Jones
Ellen Drew as Betty Moody
Leonid Kinskey as Doctor Svatsky
Minor Watson as R. P. (Phineas) Moody
Richard Bailey as Hilton Payne
Marjorie Manners as Miss Wilson
Madeline Grey as Hettie Moody
Alex Callam as Doctor Calloway
P.J. Kelly as Henry Austin, Barber
William 'Billy' Benedict as Office Boy
Jack Chefe as Pierre, a Waiter
Mike Riley and His Musical Maniacs as Themselves
Freddie Fisher and His Schnikelfritz Orchestra as Themselves
Lita Baron as herself, Isabelita
The Guadalajara Trio as Themselves
Gene Rodgers as the Boogie-Woogie Piano Player
Peppy and Peanuts as Themselves
Lyle Latell as Office Worker Comedy Routine
Alphonse Bergé as himself
Doris Duane as herself
Adia Kuznetzoff as himself (Russian Singer)
Chuy Reyes and His Orchestra as Themselves
Al Mardo and His Dog as Themselves
Dewey "Pigmeat" Markham as Pigmeat, the Butler

External links 

1944 films
1944 comedy-drama films
1940s English-language films
American black-and-white films
Republic Pictures films
Films directed by William A. Berke
American comedy-drama films
1940s American films